Gustav Lindstrom may refer to:

Gustaf Lindström (1829–1901), Swedish paleontologist
Gustav Lindström (born 1998), Swedish ice hockey player